The   (FC東京) is a men's volleyball team based in Koto, Tokyo, Japan. It plays in V.Premier League. The owner of the team is Tokyo Gas

History
It was founded in 1948 as a 9-men volleyball circle of Tokyo Gas.
It promoted to V.Challenge League in 1998.
In April 2009, it won the V.challenge match, so it will promote to the V.Premier League next season.
In December 2021, it was announced that FC Tokyo's volleyball team would suspend operations after the 2021-22 V. League season.
 In May 2022, FC Tokyo managed under Nature Lab in V. League from next season.
 In June 2022, FC Tokyo became Tokyo Great Bears

Honours
V.Premier League
Champion (0):
Runners-up (0):
All Japan Volleyball Championship
Champions (0):
Runners-up (0):
Emperor's Cup
Champion (0):
Runner-up (1): 2011
Domestic Sports Festival (Volleyball)
Champion (1): 2011

League results

References

External links
Official website

Japanese volleyball teams
Volleyball clubs established in 1948
Volleyball clubs disestablished in 2022
Volleyball
Tokyo Gas Group
1948 establishments in Japan
2022 disestablishments in Japan